Toronto West Centre was a federal electoral district represented in the House of Commons of Canada from 1925 to 1935. It was located in the province of Ontario. This riding was created in 1924 from parts of Toronto Centre and Toronto West ridings.

It consisted of the part of the city of Toronto bounded on the north by Bloor Street, on the west by Dovercourt Road, on the south by Dundas Street, and on the east by Avenue Road, Queen's Park Crescent and University Avenue.

The electoral district was abolished in 1933 when it was redistributed between Spadina, St. Paul's and Trinity ridings.

Electoral history

|- 
  
|Conservative
|HOCKEN, Horatio Clarence  
|align="right"| 10,514
  
|Liberal
|SINGER, Joseph 
|align="right"|7,495
 
|Independent
|MURPHY, Francis Herbert  
|align="right"|247   
|}

|- 
  
|Conservative
|HOCKEN, Horatio Clarence 
|align="right"|7,956 
  
|Liberal
| JOHNSTON, Frederick Graham 
|align="right"|5,388 

|Labour
|MACDONALD, John  
|align="right"|1,193    
|}

|- 
  
|Liberal
|FACTOR, Samuel  
|align="right"|8,367    
  
|Conservative
|CHURCH, Thomas Langton 
|align="right"|7,803 

|Labour
|CONNER, James McArthur  
|align="right"|264
|}

See also 

 List of Canadian federal electoral districts
 Past Canadian electoral districts

External links 

 Website of the Parliament of Canada

Former federal electoral districts of Ontario
Federal electoral districts of Toronto